This is a list of members of the New South Wales Legislative Council from 1851 to 1856. 
The 1851 Electoral Act increased the number of members in the Council to 54, 18 to be appointed and 36 elected. The initial appointments were made in October 1851. The Speaker was Charles Nicholson.

Notes

References

Members of New South Wales parliaments by term
19th-century Australian politicians